Die Abenteuer des braven Soldaten Schwejk  (Translated to The adventures of the good soldier Schwejk) is a television series produced by the ORF and ZDF and directed by Wolfgang Liebeneiner. It is based on the novel Der brave Soldat Schwejk by Jaroslav Hašek and was broadcast from 1972 to 1977. Fritz Muliar played the leading role.

Plot 
The Bohemian dog salesman Josef Schwejk (Fritz Muliar) is someone, who enjoys life to the full and cheats his way through life, in Prague at the start of the 20th century, when Prague was a part of the Austro-Hungarian Empire and before any World Wars had taken place. He was referred to publicly as an idiot who registered as a soldier when there was a greater chance of WW1 breaking out. Here he survives frequent hair-raising adventures that drive some of the people he meets into desperation.

Cast and Character

The creators of the TV series 
 Director - Wolfgang Liebeneiner
 Script - Eckart Hachfeld, Jaroslav Hašek, Grete Reiner
 Producer - F.K. Wittich, Werner Swossil, Jörg Mauthe
 Operator - Götz Neumann, Siegfried Hold
 Music - Johannes Martin Dürr 
 Artist - Wolf Witzemann, Edith Almoslino
 Installation - Annemarie Rokoss, Karl Aulitzky

Background 
Wolfgang Liebeneiner also directed Die Schatzinsel, which was broadcast as a four-part series around Christmas. Through its success and because he had also filmed "Schwejks Flegeljahre" (English: Schweijk's years of being a brat) with Peter Alexander in the leading role, Liebeneiner was encouraged to produce the series.

It was a foregone conclusion that Fritz Muliar would play the role of Schwejk. Fritz Muliar was even greatly acknowledged by Heinz Rühmann for his role, who had already played Schwejk in the movie of the same name.

The first season consisting of six episodes was already a big success in 1972. However three years passed until the second season which had seven new episodes could be produced because people who were involved were not available.

Filming took place in Krems an der Donau (in the series Prague), on the shipyard of Korneuburg (in the series marine ammunition storage of Trieste) as well as in the Weinviertel "wine quarter" (amongst others at the Karnabrunn train station along the line of Korneuburg-Hohenau).

Home release 
A DVD with all 13 episodes of the series has been available for purchase since the 17 November 2008.

See also
List of Austrian television series
List of German television series

External links
 
 http://www.bamby.de/1973/73Schwejk0.htm

Austrian television series
1972 Austrian television series debuts
1976 Austrian television series endings
1970s Austrian television series
Television series set in the 1910s
The Good Soldier Švejk
ORF (broadcaster) original programming
German-language television shows
Television shows based on Czech novels